The Singapore International Film Festival (SGIFF) (Chinese: 新加坡国际电影节) is the longest-running film festival in Singapore. Founded in 1987, the festival has a focus on showcasing international films and providing a global platform for the best of Singapore and Southeast Asian cinema. Over the decades, it has grown to become an important event in the Singapore arts calendar.

History
Originally launched to give local audiences an opportunity to watch independent and non-commercial films, the festival is now recognized worldwide by film critics for its focus on Asian filmmakers and promotion of Southeast Asian films.

SGIFF is committed to nurturing and championing homegrown talents, and to new discoveries in the art of filmmaking. Its festivities bring to this city a vibrant film culture and a deeper appreciation of its cinematic cultural life. The event serves as a catalyst to arouse the widest public interest in the arts, encouraging artistic dialogue and creative discovery. SGIFF is devoted to giving thousands of film lovers around the region direct access to the world’s most inspired films.

Featuring overseas and local artists in an eclectic array of world and Asian cinema, the event aims to open up new perspectives, make new connections and reach out to over 100,000 participants over an 11-day period. Audiences will enjoy a plethora of activities including film screenings, master classes, fringe events, discussions and awards ceremonies. The possibilities for creative interaction and the resulting exceptional synergies between the film market and other disciplines defines the Singapore International Film Festival.

Awards

The Singapore International Film Festival is credited for the discovery and promotion of the most renowned Singaporean filmmakers who are recognized globally today. Introduced in 1991, the Silver Screen Awards is an annual event that celebrates excellence in Singapore and Asian cinema.

The Silver Screen Awards features the Asian Feature Film Competition which awards the Best Film, Best Director, Best Performance, Best Cinematography and the NETPAC Award for the Critic's Prize.

References

External links
About SGIFF

 
Film festivals in Singapore